Levin August Gottlieb Theophil Graf von Bennigsen (also Лео́нтий Лео́нтьевич Бе́ннигсен (Leóntii Leónt'yevich); 10 February 1745 – 3 December 1826) was a German general in the service of the Russian Empire.

Biography

Bennigsen was born on 10 February 1745 into a Hanoverian noble family in Braunschweig (English toponym: Brunswick). His family owned several estates at Banteln in Hanover. Bennigsen served successively as a page at the Hanoverian court and as an officer of foot-guards, and four years later, in 1763, as captain, he participated in the final campaign of the Seven Years' War. In 1764, after the death of his father and his marriage to Baroness Steinberg, he retired from the Hanoverian army, and settled at the estates he owned in Banteln. In 1773, shortly after reentering Hanoverian service for a brief period, he entered the Russian service as a field officer, and was subsequently accepted into the Vyatka musketeer regiment in the same year. He fought against the Turks in 1774 and in 1778, becoming lieutenant-colonel in the latter year. In 1787 his conduct at the storming of Ochakov won him promotion to the rank of brigadier, and he distinguished himself repeatedly in smashing the Kościuszko Uprising and in the Persian War of 1796 where he fought at Derbent. On 9 July 1794, he was promoted to Major General for his accomplishments in the former campaign, and on 26 September 1794 he was awarded the Order of St. George of the Third Degree and an estate in Minsk guberniya.

In 1798 Bennigsen was fired from military service by the Tsar Paul I allegedly because of his connections with Platon Zubov. It is known that he took an active part in the planning phase of the conspiracy to assassinate Paul I, but his role in the actual killing remains a matter of conjecture. Tsar Alexander I made him governor-general of Lithuania in 1801, and in 1802 a general of cavalry.

In 1806 Bennigsen was in command of one of the Russian armies operating against Napoleon, when he fought the Battle of Pultusk and met the emperor in person in the bloody battle of Eylau (8 February 1807). In the Battle of Pultusk he resisted French troops under Jean Lannes before retreating. This brought him the Order of St. George of the Second Degree while after the battle of Eylau he was awarded Order of St. Andrew - the highest order in the Russian empire. Here he could claim to have inflicted the first reverse suffered by Napoleon, but six months later Bennigsen met with the crushing defeat of Friedland (14 June 1807) the direct consequence of which was the treaty of Tilsit.

Bennigsen was heavily criticised for the Battle of Friedland and for the decline of discipline in the army and now retired for some years, but in the campaign of 1812 he reappeared in the army in various responsible positions. He was present at Borodino, and defeated Murat in the engagement of Tarutino where he was wounded in the leg, but on account of a quarrel with Marshal Kutuzov, the Russian commander-in-chief, he was compelled to retire from active military employment on 15 November.

After the death of Kutuzov, Bennigsen was recalled and placed at the head of an army. Bennigsen participated in the battles of Bautzen and Lützen, leading one of the columns that made the decisive attack on the last day of the Battle of Leipzig (16–19 October 1813). On the same evening he was made a count by the emperor Alexander I, and he afterwards commanded the forces which operated against Marshal Davout in North Germany, most notably in the year-long Siege of Hamburg (1813–14). After the Treaty of Fontainebleau he was awarded the St. George order of the First Degree - the highest Russian military order - for his actions in the Napoleonic wars in general.

After the general peace Bennigsen held a command from 1815 to 1818, when he retired from active service and settled on his Hanoverian estate of Banteln near Hildesheim. By the end of his life he completely lost his sight. He died on 31 December 1826, in Banteln, eight years after he had retired.  His son, Count Alexander Levin von Bennigsen (1809-1893) was a distinguished Hanoverian statesman.

Bennigsen wrote the three-volume "Mémoires du général Bennigsen", which was published in Paris in 1907-1908. Though they contain "fascinating" details regarding the Russian wars and battles between 1806-1813, the work often beautifies historical facts.

Notes

References
     Also referred to in War and Peace.

Sources

External links
 Bennigsen vs Napoleon at Heilsberg 1807: one of the bloodiest battles of the Napoleonic Wars

Imperial Russian Army generals
Russian commanders of the Napoleonic Wars
Counts of Germany
People from the Electorate of Hanover
1745 births
1826 deaths
Military personnel from Braunschweig
Grand Croix of the Légion d'honneur
Russian people of the Kościuszko Uprising
People of the Russo-Persian Wars
Recipients of the Order of St. George of the First Degree
Recipients of the Order of St. George of the Second Degree
Recipients of the Order of St. George of the Third Degree
Knights Grand Cross of the Order of the Sword
Commanders Cross of the Military Order of Maria Theresa
Governors-General of Lithuania
Russian Empire regicides
Paul I of Russia